Idalberto Aranda Quintero (born May 29, 1975 in Santiago de Cuba) is a retired male weightlifter from Cuba. He twice competed for his native country at the Summer Olympics (1996 and 2000), and twice won a gold medal at the Pan American Games (1995 and 1999). He set one middleweight clean and jerk world record in 1999.

Records

References
sports-reference

1975 births
Living people
Cuban male weightlifters
Weightlifters at the 1996 Summer Olympics
Weightlifters at the 2000 Summer Olympics
Weightlifters at the 1995 Pan American Games
Weightlifters at the 1999 Pan American Games
Olympic weightlifters of Cuba
Pan American Games gold medalists for Cuba
Sportspeople from Santiago de Cuba
Pan American Games medalists in weightlifting
Medalists at the 1995 Pan American Games
Medalists at the 1999 Pan American Games
20th-century Cuban people